Despite several steps taken by the previous government in order to fight corruption in Zambia, there has not been a dramatic improvement in the public perception of anti-corruption efforts over the past years. Corruption remains pervasive in the country, yet in April 2014 the Business Anti-Corruption Portal reported that the situation in Zambia is relatively better than that of other countries in the region.

On Transparency International's 2022 Corruption Perceptions Index, Zambia scored 33 on a scale from 0 ("highly corrupt") to 100 ("very clean"). When ranked by score, Zambia ranked 116th among the 180 countries in the Index, where the country ranked first is perceived to have the most honest public sector.  For comparison, the best score was 90 (ranked 1), the worst score was 12 (ranked 180), and the average score was 43.

Unnecessarily long and complicated administrative procedures are common in Zambia's business environment, leading many companies to operate in the informal sector. The risk of widespread use of facilitation payments is also high due to the bureaucratic procedures for obtaining licences. 

Britain, Finland, Ireland and Sweden stopped their financial aid which was $34 million to Zambia due to corruption and financial mismanagement in 2018. A year later, Britain urged Zambia to take serious measures to fight corruption to get financial assistance.

See also
 Crime in Zambia

References 

Zambia
Crime in Zambia
Politics of Zambia
Social issues in Zambia